Hunne zu Pferde is a sculpture by Erich Hösel, installed outside the Alte Nationalgalerie in Berlin, Germany.

References

External links

 

Equestrian statues in Germany
Outdoor sculptures in Berlin
Sculptures of men in Germany
Statues in Germany